Parables and Paradoxes (Parabeln und Paradoxe) is a bilingual edition of selected writings by Franz Kafka edited by Nahum N. Glatzer (Schocken Books, 1961). In this volume of collected pieces, Kafka re-examines and rewrites some basic mythical tales of the Israelites, Ancient Greeks, Far East, and the Western World, as well as creations of his own imagination.

The material in the book is drawn from Kafka's notebooks, diaries, letters, short fictional works and the novel The Trial. An earlier version of the collection appeared under the title Parables, and included a smaller selection of works.

Contents

 On Parables
I
 An Imperial Message
 Pekin and the Emperor
 The News of the Building of the Wall: a Fragment
 The Great wall and the Tower of Babel
II
 Paradise
 The Tower of Babel
 The Pit of Babel
 The City Coat of Arms
 Abraham
 Mount Sinai
 The Building of the Temple
 The Animal in the Synagogue
 Before the Law
 The Watchman
 The Coming of the Messiah
III
 Prometheus
 Poseidon
 The Silence of the Sirens
 The Sirens
 Leopards in the Temple
 Alexander the Great
 Diogenes
 The New Attorney
IV
 The Building of a City
 The Imperial Colonel
 The Emperor
 In the Caravanary
 The Cell
 The Invention of the Devil
 The Savages
 The Hunter Gracchus + Fragment
 The Vulture
 The Green Dragon
 The Tiger
 The Problem of Our Laws
 The Refusal
 Couriers
 A Chinese Puzzle
 The Truth about Sancho Panza
 The Test
 Robinson Crusoe
 The Spring
 The Hunger Strike
 My Destination

Translations
Parables and Paradoxes brings together short texts from the wide variety of Kafka's works. Since different texts were handled by different translators this volume allows readers to compare the various ways Kafka's works have been rendered into English. The translators included are:
 Clement Greenberg
 Ernst Kaiser and Eithne Wilkins
 Willa and Edwin Muir
 Tania and James Stern

Short story collections by Franz Kafka
1961 short story collections
Books published posthumously
Books with cover art by Paul Bacon
Schocken Books books